Sky's the Limit (written as Skys The Limit) is the debut studio album by  American rapper Magic. It was released on September 15, 1998, on No Limit Records, Tru Records and Priority Records. The record features production from Beats By the Pound, Mark In Da Dark and DJ Daryl, and guest appearances from almost the entire No Limit and Tru Records artists roster.

Commercial performance
The album was another success for the thriving No Limit, debuting at number 15 on the Billboard 200 and  number 3 on the Top R&B/Hip-Hop Albums, selling 105,551 copies in its first week.

Track listing
"Intro"- :25
"Ghetto Godzilla"- 2:16 (feat. Master P)
"Did What I Had 2"- 4:01 (feat. Mystikal)
"Depend on Me"- 3:50 (feat. C-Murder)
"9th Ward"- 3:51
"No Hope"- 3:49 (feat. C-Murder, Lady TRU & Sons of Funk)
"Take It to Da Streets"- 2:37
"Ball 'Til We Fall"- 2:56 (feat. C-Murder)
"I Got Love 4 Ya"- 4:59  (feat. Steady Mobb'n & Snoop Dogg)
"I Never"- 2:44
"Money Don't Make Me"- 3:25 (feat. C-Murder & Soulja Slim)
"Skys the Limit"- 4:55 (feat. Mia X) 
"No Limit"- 4:11 (feat. C-Murder & Snoop Dogg)
"New Generation"- 3:04 (feat. Fiend & Mac)
"What I Gotta"- 4:00  (feat. Silkk The Shocker & Mo B. Dick)
"Hard Times"- 2:37 (feat. C-Murder)
"Life Is a Bitch"- 4:30
"Gimpin'"- 4:33 (feat. Kane & Abel, Big Ed & Mac)
"Special Forces"- 4:01 (feat. Ghetto Commission)
"When Drama Came"- 3:38 (feat. Fiend &  Snoop Dogg)
"Mobb 4 Ever"- 4:12 (feat. Prime Suspects, KLC, Fiend, Gambino Family & C-Murder)
"Chastity"- 5:17 (feat. Lil D)

Album chart positions

1998 debut albums
Magic (rapper) albums
No Limit Records albums
Priority Records albums